Cats Don't Dance is a 1997 American animated musical comedy-drama film directed by Mark Dindal (in his feature directorial debut). It is the only fully animated feature produced by Turner Feature Animation, which was merged during the post-production of Cats Don't Dance into Warner Bros. Feature Animation after the merger of Time Warner with Turner Broadcasting System in 1996. Turner Feature Animation had previously produced the animated portions of The Pagemaster (1994).

The film features the voices of Scott Bakula, Jasmine Guy, Matthew Herried, Ashley Peldon, John Rhys-Davies, Kathy Najimy, Don Knotts, Hal Holbrook, Betty Lou Gerson (in her final film role), René Auberjonois, George Kennedy, and Dindal. Its musical numbers were written by Randy Newman and includes Gene Kelly's contributions as choreographer, before his death in 1996. The film was Kelly's final film project and is dedicated to his memory.

Cats Don't Dance was released theatrically in the United States on March 26, 1997, by distributed by Warner Bros. under its Warner Bros. Family Entertainment label. Similar to other Metro-Goldwyn-Mayer films at the time, it was a box office bomb, grossing $3.5 million domestically due to lack of marketing and promotion. Despite this, the film received generally positive reviews, with praise for its animation, humor, characters, voice performances, and musical numbers.

Plot 

In an alternate 1939, in a world where humans and anthropomorphic animals coexist, Danny, an optimistic 18-year-old cat from Kokomo, Indiana, travels to Hollywood in hopes of starting an acting career there. After meeting a young penguin named Pudge, Danny is selected by agent Farley Wink to feature in a film that is in production at Mammoth Pictures called Li'l Ark Angel, alongside Wink's secretary, a beautiful yet cynical female white cat named Sawyer. Upon joining fellow animals; Tillie the hippo, Cranston the goat, Frances the fish, and T.W the tortoise, Danny is dismayed on learning how minor his role is and tries to weasel his way into more time in the spotlight. Danny unwittingly ends up angering Darla Dimple, a popular yet spoiled child actress and star of the film; she promptly assigns her 36-foot tall Frankenstein-like butler Max to intimidate Danny into no longer trying to enlarge his part.

Danny learns from the studio's mascot Woolie the elephant that human actors are normally given more important roles than animals, whereas animals themselves end up getting minor and often thankless roles to the point of having little to no leverage in show business. Longing for the spotlight, Danny tries to make a plan that will encourage humans to provide animal actors with better scenarios; Danny's ideas include assembling a massive cluster of animals and putting on a musical performance for the humans.

Later, Danny is given advice by Darla on how to interest and satisfy audiences. He takes this information to heart and groups the animals for an audition on the Ark, hoping to attract the humans' attention. However, Darla, fearing that the animals will jeopardize her spotlight, has Max help her flood the stage with 100,000 gallons of water while L.B. Mammoth, the head of Mammoth Pictures, and Flanigan, the film's director, are giving an interview, getting the animals blamed and dismissed for the collateral damage. The animals are depressed at being barred from acting in Mammoth Pictures, especially Danny, who was convinced by Darla that she was trying to help the animals. Woolie advises Danny to return to Kokomo. Later that night, everyone is at a diner, upset with Danny for ruining everything for them, while Sawyer sings a song about Danny trying to keep their dreams alive. Overhearing Sawyer singing, Tillie suggests that Sawyer follow Danny. Sawyer arrives to the bus stop, just seconds after Danny left, finding his hat and to-do list behind.

However, after a comment from the bus driver and seeing Pudge wander the streets, Danny stops the bus and comes up with another plan. He secretly invites Sawyer, Woolie, Tillie, Cranston, Frances and T.W. to the premiere of Lil' Ark Angel. After the screening and a battle with Max that sends Max flying away on a Darla Dimple balloon, Danny calls the audience's attention, only to be mocked by Darla. However, upon bringing Sawyer and the others backstage to help him and Pudge and after convincing them not to give up on their dreams no matter what the humans have said or done, the eight animals put on a musical performance that entertains and impresses the viewers. Meanwhile, Darla tries to sabotage the show by tampering with the set and special effects equipment, but her attempts instead cause her to enhance the performance and repeatedly injure herself in the process.

Darla furiously yells at the animals for foiling her plan when her voice is amplified over the theater's sound system due to a boom mic she had been tangled up with, unintentionally revealing the truth about the flooding incident to the audience, including L.B. and Flanigan. Darla tries to hide her true colors by kissing and hugging Danny, but Pudge sends her down a trapdoor. The animals achieve their dreams for larger roles, Danny and Sawyer admit their feelings for each other, and Darla is fired from showbusiness and demoted to a janitor.

Voice cast 
 Scott Bakula as Danny, an ambitious, optimistically naïve 18-year-old orange tabby from Kokomo, Indiana, who wishes to become a famous Hollywood star.
 Jasmine Guy as Sawyer (speaking), a beautiful, but disenchanted sarcastic Turkish Angora secretary of Farley Wink and Danny's love interest, later girlfriend.
 Natalie Cole as Sawyer's singing voice.
 Matthew Herried as Peabo "Pudge" Pudgemyer, a little penguin and Danny's first friend who looks up to him as a big brother. Herried was cast after he asked the animators for directions at a cafe, because of which they instantly thought he was perfect for the role.
 Ashley Peldon as Darla Dimple (speaking), the villainous human child star of Hollywood. She conceals her anger and sinister nature from her fans and superiors through a facade of sweetness and innocence, and is willing to do anything to maintain her star status. She is referred to as "America's sweetheart, lover of children and animals!" Darla is a parody of Shirley Temple and Norma Desmond.
 Lindsay Ridgeway provides Darla's singing voice.
 Kathy Najimy as Tillie Hippo (speaking/singing), a happy-go-lucky hippopotamus who tries to find the best in every situation.
 John Rhys-Davies as Woolie the Mammoth, the aging African elephant who portrays the mascot for Mammoth Pictures. He originally came to Hollywood to write and perform music where he acts as a mentor to Danny upon befriending him. Woolie is a parody of Metro-Goldwyn-Mayer's mascot Leo the Lion, as he wears mammoth tusks made of marble and a wig, which are placed on him.
 Betty Lou Gerson as Frances Albacore (speaking/singing), a sassy fish who dances with Cranston Goat and always holds a cigarette holder.
 Hal Holbrook as Cranston Goat (speaking/singing), a cranky elderly old goat who loves to dance. He is always seen with Frances and they always dance with each other.
 Don Knotts as T.W. Turtle (speaking), a nervous and superstitious turtle who always relies on fortune cookie fortunes. He originally came to Hollywood hoping to be an Errol Flynn-type star.
 Rick Logan provides T.W.'s singing voice.
 George Kennedy as L.B. Mammoth, the human head of Mammoth Pictures. He is a parody of Louis B. Mayer. His secret of success when asked by anyone is "Simple, it's Dimple!" 
 René Auberjonois as Flanigan, the human film director of "Li'l Ark Angel" who is constantly kissing up to Darla.
 Mark Dindal as Max, Darla's gargantuan, superhuman valet who obeys her every command and will not hesitate to punish anyone who crosses her. He serves as the direct force that Darla physically lacks as a child. 
 Frank Welker as Farley Wink, a human agent for animals and Sawyer's boss, who talks quickly. He thinks Sawyer is cute despite the fact that she dislikes him.
 David Johansen as Bus Driver, a man whose insults towards the animals getting fired from Mammoth Studios inspire Danny with his last plan to give the animals their long-awaited stardom.
 Dee Bradley Baker as Kong, a gorilla who appears while Danny and Sawyer are going to the set of Li'l Ark Angel at Mammoth Studios. His voice is modeled after Joe Besser. 
 Tony Pope as Alligator
 Peter Renaday as Narrator
 Amick Byram/Bobbi Page/Susan Boyd/Carmen Twillie/Sally Stevens/Bob Joyce/Oren Waters/Andrea Robinson/Terry Wood as Nothing Is Gonna Stop Us Now chorus

Production

Development 
The film was launched in 1993 as a vehicle for Michael Jackson, who would produce, star, and be a consultant in the music and choreography. It would have been a hybrid live-action/CGI film. However, by 1994, Jackson had ceased to be involved in the film. In its earlier stages, the film concerned less anthropomorphic stray cats that live among the sets and studio backlots. At one point, David Shire and Richard Maltby Jr. composed songs for the film before Randy Newman was hired.

Turner Animation was run by David Kirschner, and had originated as the feature division of Hanna-Barbera, where Kirschner was CEO. The Turner Animation writing department added cat characters based on stories about the filming of Warner Bros. Studios productions like Casablanca (1942), East of Eden (1955), and The Music Man (1962); stagehands would feed feral cats, which dominated the back lot for decades. Producers David Kirschner and Paul Gertz then decided to have dance numbers in the vein of classic musical films like Singin' in the Rain (1952). Kershner felt the style would appeal to a wide audience. The 1930s Hollywood backdrop also inspired the premise of anthropomorphic animals being allegories of those who did not look and/or sound mainstream struggling to gain attention in Hollywood in the late 1930s. 

Kirschner contacted Mark Dindal to be director of the project a year after the two met and while Dindal was working on The Rocketeer (1991). Around the same time, Brian McEntee joined as art director, Randy Newman joined as composer, and Gene Kelly joined as dance consultant. Dindal, Kirschner, and McEntee noticed the improving animation technology and were excited to see how it would be incorporated with traditional animation in Cats Don't Dance; McEntee himself worked on the computer-animated ballroom scene in Beauty and the Beast (1991). The team watched old musical films for reference before asking Kelly, who instantly joined due to his interest in the story. One meeting took place at Kelly's house between him and Dindal, and he vividly remembered how the films he starred in were choreographed. 

During production, management at Turner Feature Animation changed repeatedly and each head that came in attempted to take drastic revisions, including updating the setting to the 1950s rock-and-roll era. "It's pretty hard to try and keep what you have finished so far, and then suddenly transition into a different period of time or introduce a different character or have a completely different ending that doesn't seem to fit the beginning you have," said Dindal.

Dindal's portrayal of Max was initially a scratch track and was never intended to be heard on the film. Dindal wanted Max to be voiced by a professional actor, but as the film started running out of money, he kept his own vocals in.

Music 
Steve Goldstein composed much of the score. For the film, Randy Newman composed songs inspired by the classic songs of the Golden Age of Hollywood, including "Danny's Arrival Song", "Little Boat On The Sea", "Animal Jam Session", "Big and Loud", "Tell Me Lies", and "Nothing's Gonna Stop Us Now", while the opening and ending pop song "Our Time Has Come" was written by Martin Page and the end credits song "I Do Believe" was written by Simon Climie and Will Downing. Goldstein and Newman gathered a couple of nominations at the Annie Awards, with the latter winning the award for the musical numbers written and composed by him. 

Original songs performed in the film include:

Release 
New Line Cinema, which was a sister company to Turner Feature Animation at the time, expressed interest in distributing the film. However, when Turner Broadcasting merged with Time Warner in 1996, the film fell into the ownership of Warner Bros. Pictures. Pullet Surprise, a newly produced Looney Tunes short film featuring Foghorn Leghorn, preceded the film's theatrical release, and "The Big Sister", a Dexter's Laboratory What a Cartoon! short, followed the film in its original home video release.

Home media 
Cats Don't Dance had its first home video release on VHS and LaserDisc on August 19, 1997, by Warner Home Video. To promote the release, Warner Home Video partnered with Continental Airlines, in which the buyer received an in-pack coupon worth $125 in savings on a Continental flight. 

The film had also its first DVD release on September 3, 2002 in a pan-and-scan format with bonus features. A re-release of the same DVD, but bundled with Quest for Camelot (1998), was released on May 2, 2006. Internationally, in July 2008, Cats Don't Dance was released on DVD in widescreen in Germany, Spain, and the Benelux countries. A widescreen DVD was released for the first time in North America on November 1, 2016 via the Warner Archive Collection. The original widescreen presentation is also available digitally for rental or purchase through Google Play and also through Amazon Video.

Reception

Critical reaction 
Cats Don't Dance received a 74% approval rating on Rotten Tomatoes based on 23 reviews, with an average rating of 6.5/10. The site consensus reads, "Cats Don't Dance, but they should easily entertain all-ages audiences thanks to some colorful animation, sharp humor, and a catchy soundtrack."

Todd McCarthy of Variety wrote: "Decked out with sharp and colorful design work, some well-drawn characters and six snappy Randy Newman tunes, this first entry from Turner Feature Animation goes down very easily but lacks a hook." Roger Ebert of the Chicago Sun-Times gave the film three stars out of four. He wrote the film "is not compelling and it's not a breakthrough, but on its own terms, it works well. Whether this will appeal to kids is debatable; the story involves a time and a subject they're not much interested in. But the songs by Randy Newman are catchy, the look is bright, the spirits are high and fans of Hollywood's golden age might find it engaging." John Petrakis, reviewing for the Chicago Tribune, noted Cats Don't Dance would appeal more for adults than children, but provided a good moral lesson on prejudice. He further wrote the film has "the sharp irreverence of the brilliant Who Framed Roger Rabbit. There are plenty of clever asides and witty one-liners, not to mention a few terrific supporting characters". 

Lawrence Van Gelder of The New York Times summarized in his review: "While the animated characters, bright colors and an appealing Randy Newman score may keep the children content, Cats Don't Dance is no saccharine fantasy. Its Hollywood references and dark satire constitute its real strengths." Jack Mathews, reviewing for the Los Angeles Times, described the film as a "startling miscalculation." He next wrote: "It has lots of cute animals, some jaunty Randy Newman songs and solid, if uninspired, animation work. But blending parody and nostalgia about an era half a century removed from the lives of the core audience seems a foolish indulgence." Rita Kempley of The Washington Post wrote the film was "colorful, but unimaginatively drawn". Also from The Washington Post, Jane Horwitz felt children "won't get the references to old movies or stars like Bette Davis and Clark Gable. Still, the action (however confusing), the music and the characters should hold even toddlers for a while."

Box office 
Cats Don't Dance became a casualty of the merger between Turner and Time Warner. It received a traditional theatrical release on March 26, 1997, but without fanfare and did not draw an audience. The film grossed $3.5 million in the United States and Canada against its $32 million production budget. Dindal and Kirschner told the Los Angeles Times they were both frustrated with Warner Bros. over the lack of advertising and the failed marketing campaign.

Accolades 
Despite mostly positive reception, the Stinkers filed the film under the Founders Award in 1997 (which lamented the year's biggest studio disgraces), citing it as "loud, unfunny, and completely over the heads of its intended audience." On the other hand, when it comes to positive accolades, although failing in gathering any Oscar nominations, it became historically the first non-Disney animated film to win the Best Animated Feature at the Annie Awards.

References

External links 

 
 
 
 

1997 films
1997 animated films
1990s American animated films
1990s coming-of-age comedy films
1990s fantasy comedy films
1990s musical comedy films
1990s musical fantasy films
1990s musical films
American children's animated comedy films
American children's animated fantasy films
American children's animated musical films
American coming-of-age comedy films
American musical comedy films
Animated coming-of-age films
Animated films about cats
Annie Award winners
Best Animated Feature Annie Award winners
Films set in the 1930s
Films set in Los Angeles
Films set in California
Films set in studio lots
Films set in Paris
Noah's Ark in film
Warner Bros. films
Warner Bros. animated films
Warner Bros. Animation animated films
Films produced by David Kirschner
Films scored by Randy Newman
Films directed by Mark Dindal
Films about prejudice
1997 directorial debut films
1997 comedy films
Animation based on real people
1990s children's animated films
1990s English-language films